The stoned ape theory is a controversial theory first proposed by American ethnobotanist and mystic Terence McKenna in his 1992 book Food of the Gods. The theory claims that the transition from Homo erectus to Homo sapiens and the cognitive revolution was caused by the addition of psilocybin mushrooms, specifically the mushroom Psilocybe cubensis, into the human diet around 100,000 years ago. Using evidence largely based on studies from Roland L. Fischer et. al from the 1960s and 1970s, he attributed much of the mental strides made by humans during the cognitive revolution to the effects of psilocybin intake found by Fischer. 

McKenna's argument has largely been rejected by the scientific community, who cite numerous alleged discrepancies within his theory and claim that his conclusions were arrived to via a fundamental misunderstanding of Fischer's studies.

Overview 
In his book, McKenna argued that due to desertification in Africa, humans retreated to the shrinking tropical forests, following cattle herds whose dung attracted the insects that he states were certainly a part of the human diet at the time. According to his hypothesis, humans would have detected Psilocybe cubensis from this due to it often growing in cowpats.

According to McKenna, access to and ingestion of mushrooms was an evolutionary advantage to humans' omnivorous hunter-gatherer ancestors, also providing humanity's first religious impulse. He believed that psilocybin mushrooms were the "evolutionary catalyst" from which language, projective imagination, the arts, religion, philosophy, science, and all of human culture sprang.

Evidence 
To support his claim, McKenna used studies from the Hungarian-American psychopharmacologist Roland L. Fischer dating back to the 1960s and 1970s to underline the purported effects psychedelics would have had on mankind.

McKenna claimed that minor doses of psilocybin improve visual acuity, including edge detection, which bettered the hunting skills of early primates and thus resulted in greater food supply and reproduction. At higher doses, McKenna contended that the mushrooms would increase libido, attention, and energy, resulting in greater reproductive success. At even higher doses, the psilocybin would promote greater social bonding within early human communities as well as group sex activities, resulting in greater genetic diversity from the mixing of genes. McKenna also theorized that at this level of psilocybin intake, it would trigger activity in "language-forming region of the brain," resulting in the mental development of visions and music and kickstarting the development of language by enriching their troop signals. According to McKenna, psilocybin would also chip away at internal ego and make religious matters the forefront of the mind.

Variations 

Some who hold that the use of drugs played a pivotal role in human development argue that it was not psilocybin that initiated greater cognitive development amongst humans, but was instead spurred by other psychedelics such as DMT-containing substances, in particular, Ayahuasca. Ayahuasca has been shown to increase trait openness significantly by one standard deviation. Additionally, it has shown to increase interest in abstract ideas and visual acuity when consumed. This has led to it being hypothesized that some sort of DMT-containing substance was the culprit behind the cognitive revolution.

Reception 
The stoned ape theory had been widely criticized by the greater scientific community. McKenna's theory was labeled as overly speculative by much of the academic community and misrepresenting the studies of psychopharmacologist Roland L. Fischer, whose research was frequently cited by McKenna as evidence for the purported effects of the mushrooms on early humans. Additionally, many pointed to groups such as the Aztecs or various Amazonian tribes whose usage of psychedelic substances does not reflect to any of the evolutionary advantages that McKenna argued would emerge from using psilocybin-containing substances. To add on to prior criticisms, McKenna's claim that psilocybin intake would increase libido has been questioned as well as the belief that an increased libido will entail an evolutionary advantage.

See also 
 Aquatic ape theory

References 

1992 introductions
Human evolution
Theories
Psilocybin